Replication factor C subunit 5 is a protein that in humans is encoded by the RFC5 gene.

Function 

The elongation of primed DNA templates by DNA polymerase delta and DNA polymerase epsilon requires the accessory proteins proliferating cell nuclear antigen (PCNA) and replication factor C (RFC). RFC, also named activator 1, is a protein complex consisting of five distinct subunits of 140, 40, 38, 37, and 36 kD. This gene encodes the 36 kD subunit. This subunit can interact with the C-terminal region of PCNA. It forms a core complex with the 38 and 40 kDa subunits. The core complex possesses DNA-dependent ATPase activity, which was found to be stimulated by PCNA in an in vitro system. Alternatively spliced transcript variants encoding distinct isoforms have been reported.

Interactions 

RFC5 has been shown to interact with:
 BRD4, 
 CHTF18,
 PCNA, 
 RFC2,  and
 RFC4.

References

Further reading